Johnny Hall may refer to:

Johnny Hall (American football) (1916–1996), running back for the Chicago Cardinals and Detroit Lions
Johnny Hall (Australian footballer) (1917–2009), played for Hawthorn in the Victorian Football League
Johnny Hall (Samoan footballer) (born 1991), Samoan association defender for Brookvale FC in the Manly-Warringah Premier League

See also
John Hall (disambiguation)